Archibald Stuart (December 2, 1795 – September 20, 1855) was a nineteenth-century politician and lawyer from Virginia. He was the first cousin of Alexander Hugh Holmes Stuart and the father of Confederate General James Ewell Brown "Jeb" Stuart, who was the seventh of eleven children.

Early life
Born in Lynchburg, Virginia to Anne Dabney Stuart and Judge Alexander Stuart (who had previously served in both houses of the Virginia General Assembly), Stuart received a private education suitable to his class.

Career
He became an officer in the War of 1812 and studied law afterward. After being admitted to the bar, Stuart commenced practice in Lynchburg. He was elected to the Virginia Constitutional Convention of 1829-1830.

Stuart was elected a Democrat to the United States House of Representatives in 1836, serving from 1837 to 1839. After losing reelection to Isaac Adams, Stuart resumed practicing law.

In 1850-51 he served in the Virginia Constitutional Convention of 1850. He served to the Virginia Senate, serving from 1852 to 1854.

Death and legacy

Stuart died suddenly at his home, "Laurel Hill" in Patrick County, Virginia, on September 20, 1855. He was interred in the Stuart family cemetery at Laurel Hill. His son J.E.B. Stuart, who had graduated from the U.S.Military Academy in 1854 to start his military career, resigned his U.S. Army commission to join the Confederate States Army, eventually commanding all cavalry with the rank of Major General before his combat-related death in 1864. In 1859, this man's widow, Elizabeth Letcher Pannill Stuart, whose ancestor William Lechter had founded the plantation, and died there, killed by a Tory sympathizer in 1780) sold Laurel Hill (including the plantation house rebuilt after an 1847/8 fire) to two men from North Carolina. In 1952 the Stuart family re-interred this man's remains in Saltville (in Smyth and Washington Counties, Virginia), next to his widow,  although the family members (as well as slaves) may still be interred at Laurel Hill. In 1991, Laurel Hill was preserved by the J.E.B. Stuart Birthplace Trust, and added to the National Register of Historic Places in 1998.

Electoral history

1837; Stuart was elected to the U.S. House of Representatives with 56.08% of the vote, defeating Whig Nathaniel H. Claiborne.
1839; Stuart lost his re-election bid.

References

Bibliography

External links

1795 births
1855 deaths
19th-century American politicians
Archibald
American military personnel of the War of 1812
American people of Scotch-Irish descent
College of William & Mary alumni
Democratic Party members of the United States House of Representatives from Virginia
Democratic Party members of the Virginia House of Delegates
People from Patrick County, Virginia
Politicians from Lynchburg, Virginia
Virginia lawyers
Democratic Party Virginia state senators